Muhammad Hussain El-Farra (born April 20, 1927) was a Jordanian ambassador.

Career
From 1955 to 1959 he was lecturer in the American University of Beirut.
From 1952 to 1954 he was member of the Syrian delegation to the UN.
From 1954 to 1955 he was vice-president of the Arab Students Organization to the US. 
From 1955 to 1959 he was Speaker of the League of Arab States.
During 10 sessions he was member of the Jordan delegation to the UN General Assembly.
In 1963 he was accredited minister plenipotentiary of Jordan in Cairo (Arab Republic of Egypt).
From 1962 to 1964 he was deputy permanent representative of Jordan to the UN.
From  to  he was permanent representative of Jordan to the UN.
In March 1966 he was president of the United Nations Security Council.
In 1971 he was ambassador in Madrid Spain.
He was head or member of several delegations to the General Assembly to the UN, New York, and to the meeting in New York, Lebanon, Geneva and the League of Arab States in Cairo.
He was Assistant Secretary General for Palestine Affairs at the League of Arab States.

Publication
Year of No Decision

References

1927 births
Living people
Ambassadors of Jordan to Egypt
Ambassadors of Jordan to Spain
Permanent Representatives of Jordan to the United Nations
Jordanian expatriates in Lebanon
Academic staff of the American University of Beirut
Jordanian expatriates in the United States
Suffolk University alumni
Boston University alumni
University of Pennsylvania alumni